The Journal of Asian History is a biannual peer-reviewed academic journal covering Asian history up to 1900. It is published by Harrassowitz Verlag. The journal was established in 1967 and until 2011 edited by Denis Sinor (Indiana University. Later editors included Roderich Ptak (Ludwig-Maximilians-Universität München) and Claudius C. Müller. Since 2015 the editors-in-chief are Dorothee Schaab-Hanke (University of Hamburg) and Achim Mittag (University of Tübingen).

Abstracting and indexing
The journal is abstracted and indexed in:

References

External links

Asian history journals
Harrassowitz Verlag academic journals
Biannual journals
Publications established in 1967
English-language journals